The Lahore Qalandars cricket team is one of six teams that competed in the 2020 Pakistan Super League, representing Lahore.

Qalandars was captained by Sohail Akhtar throughout the season, the top scorer was Chris Lynn with 284 runs, but the batsman with highest average was Australian cricketer Ben Dunk, whereas the leading wicket-taker was Shaheen Afridi. For the first time in PSL history, Lahore Qalandars qualified for the play-offs after winning five of their ten group-stage matches, and finishing at third position on the points table.

Impact of COVID-19
The playoff stage of the tournament was postponed due to the COVID-19 pandemic. On 2 July 2020, PCB announced that they are looking forward to complete the season in November 2020. On 2 September 2020, the PCB confirmed the fixtures for the remaining matches. The matches were previously scheduled to be held at Gaddafi Stadium in Lahore, on 14 and 15 November, with the final scheduled to be played on 17 of November. On 24 October 2020, PCB announced that the playoffs and final of the season are relocated to National Stadium, Karachi due to poor air quality and heavy chances of smog in Lahore.

Squad
Players with international caps are shown in bold
Ages are given as fo the first match of the season, 20 February 2020

Season standings

Notes

References

External links

2020 in Punjab, Pakistan
2020 Pakistan Super League 
2020